The Substance: Albert Hofmann's LSD is a 2011 documentary film directed by Martin Witz. The film documents the coincidental discovery of the drug LSD by the Swiss chemist Albert Hofmann in 1943.

External links
 
Review by Barbara Lussi (in German)

Documentary films about LSD
2011 films
Swiss documentary films
2010s German-language films
2011 documentary films
2010s English-language films